Cham-e Gorgali (also Romanized as Cham-e Gorg‘alī) is a village in Qalayi Rural District, Firuzabad District, Selseleh County, Lorestan Province, Iran. At the 2006 census, its population was 76, in 14 families.

References 

Towns and villages in Selseleh County